Oxford Student Publications Ltd (OSPL) is an independent student publishing house in Oxford that publishes the Cherwell student newspaper, The Isis student magazine, The Oxford Scientist, formerly Bang Science Magazine, PHASER, Keep Off the Grass freshers' magazine and Industry fashion magazine.

The company is wholly independent and is run entirely by students of the University of Oxford. In 1961, OSPL was established as a holding company for Cherwell newspaper and acquired the ISIS brand in the late 1990s. The business is a private company limited by guarantee and registered at Companies House.

OSPL's income comes from subscriptions and advertising; the company receives no subsidy from Oxford University. All profits are put back into media production and into ensuring the long-term well-being of the company. Very few major student newspapers operate in this fashion and the continued success and financial viability of OSPL pays testament to its ability to attract the most capable Oxford students as journalists and managers.

Notable alumni
Notable journalistic/editorial contributors to Cherwell newspaper and Isis magazine are listed elsewhere. Notable alumni once involved in OSPL's business activities include:

Lord Heseltine, Haymarket chairman and Conservative peer;
Rupert Murdoch, chairman and CEO of News Corporation;
John Redwood, former Conservative leadership contender
Katie Ghose, Chairman of OSPL in 1990 and Chief Executive of the Electoral Reform Society.
Felicity Cloake, freelance food journalist, Guardian columnist and author of several cookbooks.

References

External links
Oxford Student Publications Limited website
Cherwell online
ISIS magazine
History of the Cherwell newspaper
Oxford Student Publications Limited on Facebook

1961 establishments in England
Publishing companies established in 1961
Companies based in Oxford
Companies associated with the University of Oxford
Oxford Student Publications Limited
Oxford Student Publications Limited
Publishing companies of the United Kingdom